Let's All Sing With the Chipmunks is the debut album of Alvin and the Chipmunks. It is an interactive children's novelty album. The songs on the record are a mixture between cover versions of children's songs in the public domain and customized original musical material. It contains the A-sides of the Chipmunks' first three singles: "The Chipmunk Song (Christmas Don't Be Late)", "Alvin's Harmonica" and "Ragtime Cowboy Joe". The artist credit on the original release was listed as Ross Bagdasarian (changed to "Alvin, Simon and Theodore with David Seville" on the revised 1961 cover).

Album cover variations
The original issue of the album depicted three realistic looking chipmunks on the cover, with Alvin making a pose like the then-recently deceased Al Jolson. When the album was reissued two years later, a new cover was substituted, that of an Alvin Show animation cel setup reenacting the poses the original chipmunks made, with the exception of Alvin, who was now shown as making a pose like Elvis Presley. The 2008 compact disc reissue uses the 1961 front cover design along with the original 1959 back cover.

Track listing

All songs would later be adapted as animated musical segments for The Alvin Show.

Side one
"Yankee Doodle" (Trad., arr. Ross Bagdasarian Sr.)  – 1:57
"Chipmunk Fun" (Bagdasarian Sr.)  – 1:58
"The Little Dog (Oh Where, Oh Where Has My Little Dog Gone)" (Septimus Winner)– 1:59
"Old MacDonald Cha Cha Cha" (Trad., arr. Bagdasarian Sr.) – 1:55
"Three Blind (Folded) Mice" (Trad., arr. Bagdasarian Sr.)  – 1:54
"Alvin's Harmonica" (Bagdasarian Sr.)  – 2:42

Side two
"Good Morning Song" (Mildred Hill) – 1:09
"Whistle While You Work" (Frank Churchill, Larry Morey) – 1:49
"If You Love Me (Alouette)" (Trad., arr. Bagdasarian Sr.) – 2:12
"Ragtime Cowboy Joe" (Maurice Abrahams)  – 2:08
"Pop Goes the Weasel" (Trad., arr. Bagdasarian Sr.)  – 1:19
"The Chipmunk Song (Christmas Don't Be Late)" (Bagdasarian, Sr.)  – 2:21

Production credits
Ross Bagdasarian - Producer
Ted Keep - Engineer
Pate/Francis & Assoc. - cover design and actual artwork - [original pressing]
Studio Five - animation artwork - reissue pressing

References

1959 debut albums
Alvin and the Chipmunks albums
Liberty Records albums
Albums produced by Ross Bagdasarian